The De is a river of Mizoram, northeastern India.

References

Rivers of Mizoram
Rivers of India